Local Motion may refer to:

Local Motion (company)
Local Motion, a brand used by Railway City Transit